Didsbury railway station may refer to:

Didsbury railway station, a former station in Didsbury, Greater Manchester, UK
a Canadian Pacific Railway station in Didsbury, Alberta, Canada
Didsbury Village tram stop, a stop on the Manchester Metrolink system in Greater Manchester, UK
East Didsbury railway station, a railway station in Didsbury, Greater Manchester, UK
East Didsbury tram stop, a stop on the Manchester Metrolink system in Greater Manchester, UK
West Didsbury tram stop, a stop on the Manchester Metrolink system in Greater Manchester, UK
Withington and West Didsbury railway station, former station in Greater Manchester, UK